Milcho Tanev (born 21 January 1983, in Stara Zagora) is a Bulgarian footballer currently playing for Vereya Stara Zagora as a midfielder.
Height - 1.80 m.
Weight - 82 kg.

External links
 2007-08 Statistics at PFL.bg

Bulgarian footballers
1983 births
Living people
First Professional Football League (Bulgaria) players
PFC Beroe Stara Zagora players

Association football midfielders
Sportspeople from Stara Zagora